Guillermina Green (1922–2006), also known as Guillermina Grin, was a Spanish film actress. She appeared in twenty three films including  The Butterfly That Flew Over the Sea (1948). She was born in Seville, to a Spanish mother and an English father, William Green, an optician who worked in the city. In 1941 she was spotted by the film director Florian Rey and given a small part in one of his films. She graduated to leading lady status, and starred in Spanish films during the decade. She later emigrated to Mexico, but retired from acting in 1951 following her marriage to producer Guillermo Calderón.

Selected filmography
 The Road to Babel (1945)
 The Butterfly That Flew Over the Sea (1948)

References

Bibliography 
 Goble, Alan. The Complete Index to Literary Sources in Film. Walter de Gruyter, 1999.

External links 
 

1922 births
2006 deaths
Spanish film actresses
People from Seville
Spanish emigrants to Mexico
Spanish people of British descent